Dr. B.R. Ambedkar National Law University (DBRANLU) is a National Law University located at Rajiv Gandhi Education City, Sonipat, Haryana, India. It is the 23rd National Law University established in India by the State Government of Haryana in the year 2012 by the State Legislature Act No. 15 of 2012. By an Amendment in 2014, the name of the university was changed from 'The National Law University Haryana' to 'Dr. B.R. Ambedkar National Law University Sonepat', in the honour of B. R. Ambedkar, social reformer and the architect of the Constitution of India.

The Chief Justice of India or his nominee, who shall be a sitting Judge of the Supreme Court, shall be the Visitor of the University. Hon'ble Bandaru Dattatreya, The Governor of Haryana is the Incumbent Chancellor, and Prof. (Dr.) Viney Kapoor Mehra, was the founder Vice Chancellor of the University. Prof. (Dr.) Archana Mishra is the incumbent Vice Chancellor of the university.

DBRANLU started its first batch for B.A. LL.B. (Hons.) Five Year Integrated Course from the academic year 2019-20. The total number of seats for the B.A. LL.B (Hons.) Five-Years Integrated Course are One Hundred and Twenty (120).

Subject to admission test results, at least 25% of the admissions will be reserved for people who live in Haryana, and a fifth of the reserved positions will be held for persons whose land was purchased for the site of the school.

References

Law schools in Haryana
Universities in Haryana
Sonipat
National Law Universities
Educational institutions established in 2012
2012 establishments in Haryana